The Nanda Devi National Park or Nanda Devi Biosphere Reserve, established in 1982 is a national park situated around the peak of Nanda Devi (7816 m) in Chamoli Garhwal district of Uttarakhand, in northern India.

The National Park was inscribed a World Heritage Site by UNESCO in 1988. It was later expanded and renamed as Nanda Devi and Valley of Flowers National Parks in 2005.

The National Park is embedded in the  sized Nanda Devi Biosphere Reserve, which, in turn, is encompassed in the  buffer zone around the Nanda Devi and Valley of Flowers National Parks UNESCO site.

The best time to visit Nanda Devi National Park is from May to October.

History

The first recorded attempt to explore the sanctuary was in 1883 by W. W. Graham, who could proceed only up to Rishi Ganga. Other attempts by explorers in 1870, (T. G. Longstaff) 1926, 1927 and 1932 (Hugh Ruttledge) did not fetch fruitful results. Eric Shipton and H. W. Tilman entered the inner sanctuary through Rishi Ganga in 1934, thus opening the extensive exploration in the sanctuary. In 1939, the area was declared as a game sanctuary.

2021 Glacial Outburst Flood 

At approximately 10:45 a.m. IST on 7 February 2021, a flooding disaster occurred all along the Rishiganga river and its valley following a landslide, avalanche or glacial lake outburst flood of the Nanda Devi glacier.

Layout of the Nanda Devi Sanctuary

The Nanda Devi Sanctuary within the National Park can be divided into two parts, Inner and Outer. Together, they are surrounded by the main sanctuary wall, which forms a roughly square outline, with high, continuous ridges on the north, east and south sides. On the west side, less high but still imposing ridges drop from the north and south toward the Rishi Ganga Gorge, which drains the sanctuary towards the west.

The Inner Sanctuary occupies roughly the eastern two-thirds of the total area, and contains Nanda Devi itself and the two major glaciers flanking the peak, the Uttari (north) Rishi Glacier and the Dakshini (south) Rishi Glacier. These are fed by the smaller Uttari Nanda Devi and Dakshini Nanda Devi Glaciers respectively. The first recorded entry of the British into the Inner Sanctuary was by Eric Shipton and H. W. Tilman in 1934, via the Rishi Gorge.

The Outer Sanctuary occupies the western third of the total sanctuary, and is separated from the Inner Sanctuary by high ridges, through which flows the Rishi Ganga. It is split in two by the Rishi Ganga; on the north side lies the Ramani Glacier, flowing down from the slopes of Dunagiri and Changabang, and on the south lies the Trisul Glacier, flowing from the peak of the same name. This portion of the sanctuary is accessible to the outside (though requiring the crossing of a  pass). The first serious climbing expedition to pass through the Outer Sanctuary was that of T. G. Longstaff, who climbed Trisul I in 1907 via the eponymous glacier.

Fauna 
Common larger mammals are Himalayan musk deer, mainland serow and Himalayan tahr. Himalayan goral are not found within, but in the vicinity of the park. Carnivores are represented by snow leopard, Himalayan black bear and perhaps also Himalayan brown bear. Langurs are found within the park, whereas rhesus macaque are known to occur in the neighboring areas of the park. In a scientific expedition in 1993, a total of 114 bird species was recognized.

Flora 
Nanda Devi National Park is home to a wide variety of flora. Some 312 floral species that include 17 rare species have been found here. Fir, birch, rhododendron and juniper are the main flora.

Vegetation is scarce In the inner sanctuary due to the dryness of the conditions. One will not find vegetation near Nanda Devi Glacier. Ramani, alpine, prone mosses and lichens are other notable floral species found in Nanda Devi National Park.

Named peaks of the park and environs

Within the sanctuary

Apart from Nanda Devi, the following peaks lie on
 Nanda Devi: 
 Devistan I, II: , 
 Rishi Kot:

On the sanctuary wall
These peaks are listed in clockwise order, starting from just north of the Rishi Gorge. Some of them are relatively minor summits and have small topographic prominence, while others are independent peaks.

 Hanuman: 
 Dunagiri: 
 Changabang: 
 Kalanka: 
 Rishi Pahar: 
 Mangraon: 
 Deo Damla:                                                                                                                                                                 
 Bamchu: 
 Sakram: 
 Latu Dhura: 
 Sunanda Devi: 
 Nanda Khat: 
 Panwali Doar (or "Panwali Dwar"): 
 Maiktoli: 
 Devtoli: 
 Mrigthuni: 
 Nanda Ghunti: 6309 m (20,699 ft)
 Bethartoli Himal:

Just outside the wall
The following are the most notable peaks which are adjacent to the wall; they are all connected to the wall by high passes. They lie just outside the boundaries of the park.
 Hardeol:  (northeast corner)
 Trishuli:  (just beyond Hardeol)
 Nanda Kot:  (southeast corner)
 Nanda Ghunti:  (southwest corner)

Nuclear-powered spying device on Nanda Devi
During the cold war era when Chinese carried out their first nuclear test in 1964 and followed it up with missile testing, the US and India actively collaborated to spy on China's nuclear capabilities. Before the advent of spy satellites much of the clandestine intelligence gathering relied on ground based sensors. The Chinese missile testing facility was north of the Himalayan range, which was a big hurdle in detecting missile telemetry signals. CIA was looking for a Himalayan peak high enough to secure a direct line of sight to the Chinese missile testing zone. Together with the Intelligence Bureau of India, they planned a secret mission to install a nuclear powered listening device on top of the peak of Nanda Devi.  A joint team of CIA hired US mountaineers together with Indian contingent from the defense forces were detailed to carry out the  secret mission. By that time the mountaineering season was concluding and the mission met with adverse climatic conditions. They left behind the plutonium fueled device with the intention of renewing their attempt during the next year's climbing season. The follow-up Indian expedition during the next season found the device missing from where it was anchored. It probably fell down due to rock fall and slid towards the glaciers carrying its plutonium with it. All the follow-up secret expeditions launched to retrieve the device met with failure. In 2018 it was reported that the Tourism Minister of Uttarakhand State Mr. Satpal Maharaj met the Prime Minister of India to express his apprehensions that the atomic device that had gone missing over 50 years ago might be polluting waters of the Ganges.

See also
 List of national parks of India
 List of World Heritage Sites in India
 National Geological Monuments of India
 Indian Council of Forestry Research and Education

References

External links

 Biodiversity Heritage Library

National parks in Uttarakhand
Protected areas established in 1982
World Heritage Sites in India
1982 establishments in Uttar Pradesh